Aryad North is at the northern part of Aryad panchayat of Alappuzha district, Kerala, India. Komalapuram is also in Aryad North.

Aryad North is famous for making coir mats of different varieties traditionally. Once coir and its bi-products were the major earning for livelihood of the people here. Even Germans & English established coir factories here because of its proximity to the Alleppey harbour attached to the Arabian Sea. Once the city of Alleppey was known as Venese of South. 

Places in Alappuzha district